Agim is an Albanian masculine given name with the meaning "dawn". It is also a surname. Notable people with the name include:

Given name 
 Agim Ademi (born 1961), Kosovan footballer and administrator
 Agim Ajdarević (born 1969), Yugoslav footballer
 Agim Bubeqi (born 1963), Albanian footballer
 Agim Cana (born 1956), Kosovan footballer
 Agim Canaj (born 1962), Albanian footballer and coach
 Agim Çavdarbasha (1944–1999), Albanian sculptor
 Agim Çeku (born 1960), Kosovan military commander and politician, Prime Minister of Kosovo 2006–2008
 Agim Dajçi (born 2000), Albanian footballer
 Agim Hajrizi (1961–1999), Kosovo Albanian human rights activist
 Agim Hushi (born 1967), Albanian-Australian singer
 Agim Ibraimi (born 1988), Macedonian footballer
 Agim Kaba (born 1980), Albanian-American actor, artist, and filmmaker
 Agim Kadillari (born 1953), Albanian painter
 Agim Krajka (1937–2021), Albanian composer
 Agim Krasniqi, Albanian nationalist and former leader of a band of insurgents
 Agim Krasniqi (politician), Kosovo Albanian economist, civil servant, and politician
 Agim Meto (born 1986), Albanian footballer
 Agim Murati (1953–2005), Albanian footballer
 Agim Nesho (born 1956), Albanian former Ambassador
 Agim Nuhiu (born 1977), Macedonian politician, former Interior Minister
 Agim Qirjaqi (1950–2010), Albanian actor and television director
 Agim Rada (born 1953), Albanian sculptor
 Agim Ramadani (1963–1999), Albanian Army commander and writer, known professionally as Katana
 Agim Shabani (born 1988), Norwegian footballer
 Agim Sherifi (born 1994), Albanian footballer
 Agim Shuke (1942–1992), Albanian film and stage actor
 Agim Sopi (born 1969), Macedonian football coach and manager
 Agim Sulaj (born 1960), Albanian painter
 Agim Zajmi (1936–2013), Albanian painter
 Agim Zeka (born 1998), Albanian footballer

Surname 
 Akomaye Agim, Nigerian judge who was former chief justice of the Gambia and of Swaziland
 McTelvin Agim, American football defensive lineman

References

Masculine given names
Albanian masculine given names